Wernyol was known as the largest city in Twic East County of Jonglei state in South Sudan. It is in the center of Jonglei state and close to the White Nile River.

Population
An approximate population of 35,000 people live in and around Wernyol. There are many tribes living in former Lith community, which consists of Kongor, Adhiok, Ayual, Dacheck, Awulian and Abek. Lith Payam headquarters is Wernyol, which consists of two tribes: Adhiok and Abek.

Climate
Wernyol city's climate is divided into four seasons the wet rainy (winter), hot dry (summer), spring, and the autumn.

Industry
The main industry in Wernyol city is agriculture. Many people are farmers who keep cattle, sheep and poultry. Others are fishermen on the White Nile River.

References

Populated places in Jonglei State
Twic East County